KVUW (102.3 FM, "SAM 102") is a radio station licensed to serve West Wendover, Nevada. The station is owned by Alexander Ortega. It airs an adult hits music format.

The station was assigned the KVUW call letters by the U.S. Federal Communications Commission (FCC) on August 14, 2001.

Ownership
In April 2005, Mountain States Radio Inc. (Victor A. Michael, president) acquired KVUW as part of a two-station deal from Mt Rushmore Broadcasting Inc. (Jan C. Gray, president) for a reported sale price of $750,000.

Construction permit
On December 12, 2011 the station was granted a construction permit by the FCC to increase its effective radiated power to 100,000 watts and raise its antenna to a height above average terrain of 600 meters (1970 feet). The transmitter would also be moved northwest to 41°07'19"N, 114°34'02"W. This permit expires on December 12, 2014.

References

External links

VUW
Adult hits radio stations in the United States
Radio stations established in 2005